Scott Avedisian (born January 16, 1965) is an American politician and the former Republican mayor of Warwick, Rhode Island, the third largest city in the state after Providence and Cranston.

Avedisian represented Ward 1 in the Warwick City Council from 1990 to 2000, being reelected four times. He was first elected mayor in 2000, and served until 2018. He is the youngest person ever elected as Mayor of Warwick and was the youngest person ever elected to the Warwick City Council. In April 2018, Avedisian announced that he was stepping down from office to become the head of the Rhode Island Public Transit Authority, better known as RIPTA.

Avedisian holds an undergraduate degree from Providence College and a Master of Public Administration degree from Roger Williams University. He also received an honorary degree from the New England Institute of Technology. He is of Armenian descent.

References

1965 births
Living people
American people of Armenian descent
Providence College alumni
Roger Williams University alumni
Rhode Island Republicans
Mayors of Warwick, Rhode Island
Rhode Island city council members
21st-century American politicians
Ethnic Armenian politicians